Pontus Själin (born June 12, 1996) is a Swedish ice hockey player. He is currently playing with Luleå HF organization in the Swedish Hockey League (SHL). Själin was selected by the Minnesota Wild in the sixth round (160th overall) of the 2014 NHL Entry Draft.

Själin made his Swedish Hockey League debut with Leksands IF during the 2014–15 SHL season. On May 27, 2015, Själin left Leksands in order to sign a two-year contract with fellow SHL competitors Luleå HF.

Career statistics

References

External links

1996 births
Asplöven HC players
IF Björklöven players
Leksands IF players
Living people
Luleå HF players
Minnesota Wild draft picks
People from Östersund
Swedish ice hockey defencemen
Sportspeople from Jämtland County